Paula Sancho Gutiérrez (born 12 June 1998), most commonly known as Pauleta, is a Spanish footballer who plays as a midfielder for Rayo Vallecano.

Club career
Pauleta started her career at Mare Nostrum's academy.

References

External links
Profile at La Liga

1998 births
Living people
Women's association football midfielders
Spanish women's footballers
People from Sagunto
Sportspeople from the Province of Valencia
Footballers from the Valencian Community
Valencia CF Femenino players
Fundación Albacete players
Rayo Vallecano Femenino players
Primera División (women) players
Segunda Federación (women) players
Spain women's youth international footballers